Methylopila oligotropha is a bacterium species from the genus Methylopila which has been isolated from soil from a salt mine in Solikamsk in Russia.

References

Further reading

External links
Type strain of Methylopila oligotropha at BacDive -  the Bacterial Diversity Metadatabase

Methylocystaceae
Bacteria described in 2014